M. viridis  may refer to:
 Macrozamia viridis, a burrawang, a plant species found in Australia
 Mantella viridis, the green mantella, a frog species found in Madagascar
 Marenzelleria viridis, a species of marine worm found in European coastal waters
 Megalaima viridis, the small green barbet (or white-cheeked barbet), a bird species found in southern India
 Melibe viridis, a species of sea slug found in the tropical Indo-West Pacific
 Mentha viridis, a synonym of M. spicata, spearmint, a species of aromatic perennial herbs cultivated around the world
 Merops viridis, the blue-throated bee-eater, a bird species found in South-East Asia
 Microcystis viridis, a species of freshwater cyanobacteria observed in Europe and Australia
 Monachanthus viridis, an obsolete synonym for three species of orchid: Catasetum barbatum (the bearded catasetum), Catasetum macrocarpum (the monkey goblet or monk's head orchid) and Catasetum cernuum (the nodding catasetum)
 Monardella viridis, the green monardella, a perennial herb species found in California
 Morelia viridis, the green tree python, a snake species found in New Guinea, Indonesia and parts of Australia
 Musa viridis, a plant species in the banana and plantain family, found in Vietnam
 Myxodes viridis, a blenny, a fish species found along the coast of Chile and Peru

See also
 Viridis (disambiguation)